William Vasilyevich Pokhlyobkin (August 20, 1923 – April 15 (burial date), 2000; , Viliyam Vasilievich Pokhlyobkin) was a Soviet and Russian historian specializing in Scandinavian studies, heraldry, the diplomacy and international relations of Russia. He was also known as a geographer, journalist, expert on the history of Russian cuisine and the author of numerous culinary books. His A History of Vodka has been translated into a number of languages, including English.

Biography 
William Pokhlyobkin was born to Russian revolutionary Vasili Mikhailov (Михайлов Василий Михайлович). "Pokhlyobkin" was Mikhailov's underground nickname,  derived from the word "" which is a Russian type of vegetable soup. Vasili named his son after Vladimir Ilyich Lenin (VIL is an acronym which turned into William).

He took part in the Soviet-Finnish War and German-Soviet War as a private. After his discharge from service, he studied at the Moscow State Institute of International Relations from 1945–1949, and later did postgraduate courses in the Institute of History of the USSR Academy of Sciences. He became a Kandidat of Historical Sciences and a research member in the Institute of History in 1953. He founded the journal Skandinavskii sbornik ("Скандинавский сборник") and was its chief editor from 1955-1961. He was later a member of the editorial collegium of the journal Scandinavica.

In 1968 he was labeled a dissident because his book on tea was popular in dissident circles.  He was barred from publication, thus was unable to finish his doctoral dissertation, and had to concentrate on his culinary hobby. His book on Vodka has been criticized by Lev Usyskin for containing errors, and a trademark dispute between the Soviet Union and Poland over usage of the word "vodka" that Pokhlyobkin supposedly provided research for did not occur. 

He was the author of over 50 books and a large number of articles. For a long time his books remained unpublished, and most of them were printed after the dissolution of the Soviet Union. Printed simultaneously in large numbers they gave rise to speculation that "Pokhlyobkin" was a pen name of a whole artel of writers.

In 1993 he was awarded Langhe Ceretto Prize, an international award for outstanding culinary writing, awarded by Ceretto Brothers winery on the basis of recommendations of an international committee. 

Pokhlyobkin was found murdered in his apartment, in Podolsk somewhere between March 27 and 31, 2000. He was stabbed eleven times with a screwdriver and alcohol was found in his system despite being a teetotaler. His dead body was uncovered by the chief editor of the Polyfakt publishing house, who was worried about the delay of the book Cuisine of the Century and came from Moscow to Podolsk to see Pokhlyobkin.  A large number of his books on Scandinavian topics remain unpublished.

See also
List of unsolved murders

Bibliography

Culinary 
 Tea: Types, Properties, and Use. Food Industry, Moscow, 1968.

 Everything about Spices. Food Industry, Moscow, 1973.

 The Ethnic Cuisines of our Peoples. Light and Food Industry, Moscow, 1978.

 Secrets of Good Cooking. Molodaya Gvardiya, Moscow, 1979.

 Cooking for Fun. Light and Food Industry, Moscow, 1983.

 On Culinary from A to Z. A Reference Book. Polymya, Minsk, 1988.

 A History of Vodka. Inter-Verso, Moscow, 1991.
 A History of Vodka.  Verso-Books, Moscow, 1992.

 The Dinner is Served! Repertoire of Food and Beverages in the Russian Classical Dramas from the End of the 18th Century to the Beginning of the 20th Century. Artist, Director and Theater, Moscow, 1993.

 Tea and Vodka in the History of Russia. Kransoyarsk, 1995.

 Culinary Dictionary. Tsentrpoligraf, Moscow, 1996.

 From the History of Russian Culinary Culture. Tsentrpoligraf, Moscow, 1997.

 History of Essential Foodstuff. Tsentrpoligraf, Moscow, 1997.

 Culinary Arts and Cooking Accessories. Tsentrpoligraf, Moscow, 1999.

 My Cuisine and My Menu. Tsentrpoligraf, Moscow, 1999.

 Culinary arts. Tsentrpoligraf, Moscow, 1999.

 Cuisine of the Century. Polifakt, Moscow, 2000.

 Great Encyclopedia of Culinary Arts. Tsentrpoligraf, Moscow, 2003.

History and Politics 
 Denmark. Geografgiz, Moscow, 1955.

 Sweden, Norway, Denmark, Iceland. Geografgiz, Moscow, 1956.

 Norway. Geografgiz, Moscow, 1957.

 Scandinavian Countries and USSR. Znaniye, Moscow, 1958.

 Finland and the Soviet Union. Znaniye, Moscow, 1961.

 The Baltic and the Fight for Peace. Znaniye, Moscow, 1966.

 State System of Iceland. Yuridicheskaya Literatura, Moscow, 1967.

 USSR - Finland. 260 Years of Relations (1713—1973). International Relations, Moscow, 1975.

 Urho Kaleva Kekkonen. Political Biography. International Relations, Moscow, 1985.
 Urho Kaleva Kekkonen.  Eesti Raamat, Tallinn, 1988.

 Dictionary of International Symbols and Emblems. International Relations, Moscow, 1989.

 Tatars and Rus. 360 Years of Relations between Rus and Tatar States in 13-16 Centuries, 1238-1598 (from the Battle on the River Sit' to the Conquering of Siberia). International Relations, Moscow, 2000.

 Foreign Policy of Rus, Russia, USSR for 1000 Years, in Names, Dates and Facts. A Reference Book. International Relations, Moscow, 1992.

 The Great Pseudonym (about Joseph Stalin's name). Yudit, Moscow, 1996.

 The Great War and the Peace that Never Happened 1941 - 1945 - 1994. A Military and Foreign-Policy Reference Book on the History of the Great Patriotic War and its International Legal Aftereffects from June 22nd 1941 to August 31st 1994. Art-Business Center, Moscow, 1997.

References

External links
Pokhlebkin murdered 
Interview by Radio Liberty 

Pokhlebkin
Pokhlebkin
People murdered in Russia
Pokhlebkin
Russian murder victims
Pokhlebkin
Unsolved murders in Russia
Soviet military personnel of World War II
Deaths by stabbing in Russia